Alton Township may refer to:

 Alton Township, Madison County, Illinois
 Alton Township, Waseca County, Minnesota